Nikolay Aleksandrovich Kuznetsov (born 1 July 1953) is a Russian rower who competed for the Soviet Union in the 1976 Summer Olympics. He was a crew member of the Soviet boat which won the bronze medal in the coxless fours event.

References

External links
 
 

1953 births
Living people
Russian male rowers
Soviet male rowers
Olympic rowers of the Soviet Union
Rowers at the 1976 Summer Olympics
Olympic bronze medalists for the Soviet Union
Olympic medalists in rowing
World Rowing Championships medalists for the Soviet Union
Medalists at the 1976 Summer Olympics